James Cameron-Dow (born 18 May 1990) is an Irish cricketer. He made his international debut for the Ireland cricket team in March 2019.

Domestic career
He made his List A debut for Northern Knights in the 2018 Inter-Provincial Cup on 28 May 2018. He made his first-class debut for Northern Knights in the 2018 Inter-Provincial Championship on 29 May 2018. He was the leading wicket-taker for Northern Knights in the 2018 Inter-Provincial Championship, with fourteen dismissals in four matches. In April 2019, he was one of five cricketers to be awarded with an Emerging Player Contract by Cricket Ireland, ahead of the 2019 domestic season.

International career
In January 2019, he was named in Ireland's Test and One Day International (ODI) squads for their series against Afghanistan in India. He made his ODI debut for Ireland against Afghanistan on 2 March 2019. He made his Test debut for Ireland against Afghanistan on 15 March 2019.

References

External links
 

1990 births
Living people
Irish cricketers
Ireland Test cricketers
Ireland One Day International cricketers
Place of birth missing (living people)
Northern Knights cricketers